The 1949 UK & Ireland Greyhound Racing Year was the 24th year of greyhound racing in the United Kingdom and Ireland.

Roll of honour

Summary
The annual totalisator turnover was a healthy £85,643,207, which although the fifth highest ever recorded was also the third consecutive drop since 1946. 

Another concern was the fact that there were 207 tracks operating which was 63 less than during 1934. The industry put the blame squarely on government legislation that continued to squeeze operating profits. The government however were under pressure from organisations such as the Committee of Churches and ordered a public session. They presented evidence to the Royal Commission of Betting Lotteries and Gaming attacking all forms of betting with greyhound racing being singled out in particular, with mention of all under 18s being banned from tracks and the deduction from the totalisator to be brought down from its current percentage with no gain for promoters through the operations of the bookmakers. The session resulted in a full blown disagreement. 

Narrogar Ann became only the second bitch to win the English Greyhound Derby which was also the second success in three years for the British breeders.

Tracks
Employment at National Greyhound Racing Club tracks was 4,140 permanent employees and 14,809 part-time.

Tracks opened

Competitions
Local Interprize continued his success by winning a second consecutive Gold Collar title. The Wimbledon Two Year Old Produce Stakes offered a first prize of £900 for the 36 runner event. It was won on 22 June by Huntlawrigg, trained by Jerry Hannafin. The schedule of big races took a major hit as both the Welsh Greyhound Derby and Scottish Greyhound Derby were cancelled following problems over insufficient entries and funding. Local Interprize once again ran well in the Scurry Gold Cup but got beaten by a short head in the final to Burndennet Brook.

Trainer Stan Martin claimed the first two places with Ballymac Ball and Magna Hasty in the Laurels. Ballymac Ball won his heat beating Eastern Madness by three lengths and setting a new fast time for the event which was also a track record at Wimbledon of 28.03 seconds. He improved this time in his semi-final with a time of 27.99 seconds, beating Trev's Jubilee by twelve lengths, with Local Interprize a further length behind. He was the first greyhound to break 28 seconds at Wimbledon for 500 yards and in the final won by two lengths from kennelmate Magna Hasty, he possessed the same speed as his half-brother Ballyhennessy Seal. Defending champion Good Worker finished fifth with his trainer the former Surrey cricketer Jack Daley relinquishing his licence to become a cricket coach.  

Ballymac Ball next contested the Thames Silver Salver at Southend Stadium, winning his heat and semi-final but, in the final, was beaten three lengths by Red Wind in 27.78 seconds, a new track record. Red Wind went on to win the Grand Prix. Defending champion Rio Cepretta did well to make the Oaks final again, two years after her triumph, the race was won by Still Drifting. Trainer Frank Davis continued his fine run in the sport and winning a major double in the October events, Red Wind had won the Grand Prix from kennelmate Drumgoon Boy and then the latter made amends by becoming Cesarewitch champion from another kennelmate Quare Caltha. The year ended with Ballymac Ball setting another track record, on 10 December, at White City over 550 yards in a time of 30.30 seconds when beating Good Worker and Narrogar Ann and on Boxing Day he went even faster in a time of 30.27, beating Red Wind, Eastern Madness and Narrogar Ann again.  

The Bob Burls trained Behattan Marquis ended the year as the leading open race winner after 14 victories. He earned £2,637 in prize money and won the Wood Lane Stakes, the Northern Flat, the Midland Flat, the Summer Cup and the Eclipse.

News
Clapton Stadium appointed a new trainer called Sidney Clare Orton known as 'Clare', son of Sidney Orton, he had spent three years at Coventry. Fred Trevillion's put up his entire operation up for sale which consisted of his £150,000 estate including kennels for 100 greyhounds, a schooling track, farmhouse and forty acres. Trevillion would later return to the United States but later died there greatly disillusioned. 

At greyhound racing's premier track (White City) three new sea-food bars attract more than 4,000 customers on race nights and the track employs 14 part time staff to cope with the demand. Wimbledon introduced a new photo finish system which is unveiled by Instaprint Ltd.

Ireland
Tim 'Chubb' O’Connor bred a successful litter from a mating with his bitch Cordal Moonlight. He put her to Shaggy Lad and four of the litter Spanish Lad, Spanish Emperor, Spanish Treasure and Ardraw Moonlight excelled in coursing which prompted O'Connor to mate her again. This time it was to Rebel Abbey and resulted in a greyhound named Spanish Chestnut. Spanish Lad won the Irish Greyhound Derby and Spanish Chestnut caused a sensation when winning the Irish Laurels in early September, aged just 18 months beating Derby champion and older half-brother Spanish Lad into second place.

Ear-marking for litters is introduced and all Irish greyhounds must be named by ten months old.

Principal UK races

Totalisator Returns

The totalisator returns declared to the licensing authorities for the year 1949 are listed below. Tracks that did not have a totalisator in operation are not listed.

Summary

+ number of tracks include those without a tote in operation

References 

Greyhound racing in the United Kingdom
Greyhound racing in the Republic of Ireland
UK and Ireland Greyhound Racing Year
UK and Ireland Greyhound Racing Year
UK and Ireland Greyhound Racing Year
UK and Ireland Greyhound Racing Year